Ulli and Marei (German: Ulli und Marei) is a 1948 Austrian drama film directed by Leopold Hainisch and starring Eduard Köck, Attila Hörbiger and Ludwig Auer. It was made by Wien-Film in German-occupied Austria. It is a heimatfilm shot in the Tyrolean Alps. It was completed in 1945 towards the end of the Second World War, and was not given a full release until 1948.

The film's sets were designed by the art director Fritz Jüptner-Jonstorff.

Cast

See also
 Überläufer

References

Bibliography 
 Hans-Michael Bock and Tim Bergfelder. The Concise Cinegraph: An Encyclopedia of German Cinema. Berghahn Books.

External links 
 
 Ulli und Marei Full movie at Deutsche Filmothek

1948 films
German drama films
Austrian drama films
1948 drama films
1940s German-language films
Films directed by Leopold Hainisch
Films shot in Austria
Films set in Austria
Films set in the Alps
Austrian black-and-white films